Çavuşlu is a village in Tarsus district of Mersin Province, Turkey. It is situated in the southern slopes of the Taurus Mountains to the east of Turkish state highway . The population of the village was 286 as of 2012. The main agricultural product of the village is grape.

References

Villages in Tarsus District